The Homecoming of Odysseus is a 1922 German silent historical film directed by Max Obal and starring Luciano Albertini, Cläre Lotto, and Heinrich Schroth.

The film's sets were designed by the art director Hans Sohnle.

Cast

References

Bibliography

External links

1922 films
Films of the Weimar Republic
German silent feature films
Films directed by Max Obal
German black-and-white films
Phoebus Film films
1920s German films